Charles (William Charles Mark) Kent  (1823-1902) was an English poet, biographer, and journalist, born in London.  After completing his education at Prior Park and Oscott, he became editor of the Sun (1845–70), studied law at the same time and was called to the bar in 1859 as a member of Middle Temple, but thereafter devoted himself to literature.  He edited Weekly Register, a Roman Catholic paper (1874–81).

A personal friend of Charles Dickens, he contributed to Household Words and All the Year Round under Dickens's editorship and to other periodicals.  Several volumes of poems, published previously in the forties, fifties, and sixties, provided the materials for his collected Poems (1870).

In later years he gave himself largely to editorial work—chiefly complete editions of the greater English writers, memoirs, and critiques, and notably Burns (1874), Lamb (1875 and 1893), Moore (1879), Father Prout (1881), and Lord Lytton (1875, 1883,  and 1898). He also wrote Leigh Hunt as an Essayist (1888), The Wit and Wisdom of Lord Lytton (1883), and The Humour and Pathos of Charles Dickens (1884).
+

Publications

Works
 Poems (1870) 
 A mythological dictionary (1870) 
 Charles Dickens as a Reader (1872) 
 Leigh Hunt as an Essayist (1888)
 The Wit and Wisdom of Lord Lytton (1883)
 The Humour and Pathos of Charles Dickens (1884)

Contributions to the DNB

 Charles Michael Baggs
 Peter Augustine Baines
 William Barrett
 Hezekiah Linthicum Bateman
 Sidney Frances Bateman
 William Beckford
 Edward Bellasis
 John Chippendall Montesquieu Bellew
 Craven Fitzhardinge Berkeley
 Francis Henry Fitzhardinge Berkeley
 George Charles Grantley Fitzhardinge Berkeley
 Mary Berry
 Henry Digby Best
 Charles Bindley
 John Augustine Birdsall
 William Blanchard
 Countess Marguerite of Blessington
 John William Bowden
 George Bowyer
 James Yorke Bramston
 John Briggs (1788-1861)
 James Brown
 Thomas Joseph Brown
 William Henry Lytton Earle Bulwer
 James Calderbank
 Leonard Calderbank
 Thomas Carrick
 Thomas Chatterton
 Henry Cockton
 William Hepworth Dixon
 Charles Dolman
 John Doran
 Count D'Orsay, Alfred Guillaume Gabriel
 George Errington
 Frederick John Fargus
 Henry Ibbot Field
 John Forster
 James Robert Hope-Scott
 Edward George Fitzalan-Howard
 Henry Charles Howard
 Henry Granville Fitzalan- Howard
 Joseph Howe
 William Blanchard Jerrold
 Augustin Louis Josse
 Frances Maria Kelly
 Miles Gerald Keon
 Charles Mackay
 Pasquale Paoli
 Charles Reade
 Alfred Bate Richards
 George Rose (1817-1882)
 Marmion W. Savage
 John Palgrave Simpson
 George Augustus Frederick Percy Sydney Smythe
 Tom Taylor
 George Walter Thornbury
 George Alfred Walker
 Nicholas Patrick Stephen Wiseman

Contributions to Encyclopædia Britannica (1911)
Henry Bulwer, 1st Baron Dalling and Bulwer

Pseudonym Mark Rochester
 The Derby Ministry: A Series of Cabinet Pictures (1858) 
 The Gladstone Government: Being Cabinet Pictures (1869)

Works about Kent
 Obituary: Mr. Charles Kent, man of letters in The Times
 Charles Kent in Notes by the Way by  J. C. Francis, (1909).

External links

 
 
 Charles Kent Papers. James Marshall and Marie-Louise Osborn Collection, Beinecke Rare Book and Manuscript Library, Yale University.

1823 births
1902 deaths
English male poets
English biographers
Charles Dickens
Writers from London
People educated at Prior Park College
Alumni of St Mary's College, Oscott
Members of the Middle Temple
English male novelists
Male biographers